White Meadow Lake is an unincorporated community and census-designated place (CDP) located within Rockaway Township, in Morris County, New Jersey, United States. As of the 2010 United States Census, the CDP's population was 8,836.

Geography
According to the United States Census Bureau, the CDP had a total area of 4.318 square miles (11.184 km2), including 3.847 square miles (9.964 km2) of land and 0.471 square miles (1.221 km2) of water (10.92%).

Demographics

Census 2010

Census 2000
As of the 2000 Census, there were 9,052 people, 3,046 households, and 2,562 families living in the CDP. The racial makeup of the CDP was 91.6% White, 1.61% African American, 0.1% Native American, 4.7% Asian, 0.9% from other races, and 1.1% from two or more races. Hispanic or Latino of any race were 4.7% of the population.

There were 3,046 households, out of which 45.4% had children under the age of 18 living with them, 75% were married couples living together, 7.1% had a female householder with no husband present, and 15.9% were non-families. 11.9% of all households were made up of individuals, and 3.9% had someone living alone who was 65 years of age or older. The average household size was 2.97 and the average family size was 3.25.

In the CDP, the population was spread out, with 28.7% under the age of 18, 5.3% from 18 to 24, 33.3% from 25 to 44, 24.8% from 45 to 64, and 8.0% who were 65 years of age or older. The median age was 36 years. For every 100 females, there were 98.0 males. For every 100 females age 18 and over, there were 95.1 males.

The median income for a household in the CDP was $83,708, and the median income for a family was $89,345. Males had a median income of $57,400 versus $41,057 for females. The per capita income for the CDP was $32,596. About 1.2% of families and 2.3% of the population were below the poverty line, including 3.1% of those under age 18 and 1.5% of those age 65 or over.

Community
All homeowners in White Meadow Lake are members of the White Meadow Lake Property Owners Association, Inc., which owns and maintains the lake itself and its beaches, boat docks, club house and other facilities. Full membership dues (as of 2018) were $685.00 per home.

Two places of worship are located within White Meadow Lake, both Jewish: the White Meadow Temple, a Conservative congregation, and a Chabad center.

Copeland Middle School, part of the Rockaway Township Public Schools, is located in White Meadow Lake as is Stony Brook Elementary School. Elementary students in White Meadow Lake will attend either Stony Brook or Catherine A. Dwyer Elementary School. High School students from White Meadow Lake attend Morris Hills High School in Rockaway Borough.

References

External links
 White Meadow Lake official website
 Hub Lakes Sports League official website
 Rockaway Township, Morris County, New Jersey official website

Census-designated places in Morris County, New Jersey
Rockaway Township, New Jersey